The Colleton County Courthouse was built in 1820. It was listed on the National Register of Historic Places in 1971. The building is located corner of Jeffries and Hampton Streets in Walterboro, South Carolina. The building was put on the register as an example of Greek Revival architecture and also due to its historical significance, since the first meeting on nullification was held in the building in 1828.

History
In 1817, Walterboro became the seat of Colleton County. The design of the courthouse is attributed to the architect Robert Mills. The building was completed in 1820 by Charleston contractors, J. & B. Lucas.

In June 1828, Robert Rhett, participating in the first meeting on nullification, which was held in the courthouse building, delivered a speech which urged John Taylor, the governor of South Carolina, to immediately convene a session of the state legislature. Another nullification meeting was held in October of the same year.

In 2023, the courthouse was the site of the Trial of Alex Murdaugh.

Architecture
The courthouse building has two storeys and is made of brick. The entrance is built as a portico with four Tuscan columns and two staircases with ironwork railings. The courtroom is located in the second floor. The basement is raised.

The original building from 1820 was considerably altered in 1939, when two wings were built.

References

Courthouses on the National Register of Historic Places in South Carolina
County courthouses in South Carolina
Government buildings completed in 1820
Buildings and structures in Colleton County, South Carolina
Robert Mills buildings
National Register of Historic Places in Colleton County, South Carolina